Pete Doherty (born January 18, 1945) is a retired American professional wrestler and television commentator known by his ring name The Duke of Dorchester.

Professional wrestling career
Doherty began his career in the 1970s, wrestling for Vince McMahon Sr. in the World Wide Wrestling Federation (WWWF). At the time, McMahon's territory consisted of only the Northeast states, and Doherty wrestled all over in small and large venues. Doherty wrestled under the name, "The Duke of Dorchester" paying homage to his hometown of Dorchester, Massachusetts. The Duke was generally relegated to undercard status either wrestling against the stars of his era or against other undercard "jobbers". The Duke had a short lived run as a masked wrestler named The Golden Terror and was managed by Captain Lou Albano. Although, The Duke was used as "enhancement talent" in the WWF, The Duke scored upset victories against fellow preliminary wrestlers like Fred Marzino and Jose Luis Rivera, including The Duke defeating Marzino 28 times with no wins scored by Marzino. The Duke was known in the ring for his long blond hair, missing teeth and wild mannerisms. The Duke's constant, in ring banter and screaming, could be heard in the last row of the arena. His signature "move" was getting stuck in a full nelson and then placing his legs on the top rope in order for his opponent to have to break the hold. The end result was that the opponent would release and The Duke would land on his head. 

In 1985, The Duke appeared on WWF's Saturday Night's Main Event I. The Duke lost a match to the Junkyard Dog. In 1987, although being a heel, The Duke had a short feud with fellow heel wrestler King Kong Bundy. In addition to feuding with Bundy, The Duke had several grudge matches against the likes of S. D. Jones, "Leaping" Lanny Poffo and Scott Casey, even gaining a win over Poffo in his hometown of Boston. In fact, his feud with Jones came about due to him getting a fluke win after a losing streak the announcers alleged had crossed the 300 mark. In the late 1980s, Vince McMahon put Doherty in the broadcasting booth with The Duke announcing several WWF events around the US, but mostly in Boston as a heel commentator, usually alongside the likes of Gorilla Monsoon and Lord Alfred Hayes in Boston and Bruce Prichard and Mike McGuirk (and sometimes Bobby "The Brain" Heenan) around the country. The Duke's biggest win came on July 14, 1990 when he pinned former tag team champion Haku at the Boston Garden. In September 1991, he competed in the King of the Ring tournament as a substitute for "The Texas Tornado" Kerry Von Erich, but was eliminated in the first round when he was defeated in just 33 seconds by Bret "Hitman" Hart. The Duke retired from wrestling in 1997 making occasional appearances at local events including the WWF's final event at the old Boston Garden. In April 2010, Doherty was inducted into the New England Pro Wrestling Hall of Fame.

Personal life
Doherty now resides with his wife Joan in Falmouth, Massachusetts. A play based on Doherty's life appeared at the New York International Fringe Festival in 2013.

Awards and accomplishments
New England Pro Wrestling Hall of Fame
Class of 2010

References
onlineworldofwrestling
boston.com

Notes

1945 births
American color commentators
American male professional wrestlers
Living people
Professional wrestlers from Massachusetts
Professional wrestling announcers
Sportspeople from Boston
20th-century professional wrestlers